George Dibrell Young III (born September 28, 1955) was the fourth bishop of the Episcopal Diocese of East Tennessee from 2011 until 2017.

Bibliography
Young was born on September 28, 1955 in Jacksonville, Florida. He studied at the Florida State University and graduated with a Bachelor of Science in 1978. In 1981 he married the now-Reverend Kathryn Mary Young (nee Beich) and together had two children. He then enrolled at Seabury-Western Theological Seminary, from which he graduated with a Master of Divinity in 1990.

Young was ordained deacon and priest in 1990 by the Bishop of Florida, Frank S. Cerveny. He then became assistant at St. Giles' Church in Northbrook, Illinois and director of religious education. In 1994 he returned to Florida and became rector of St. Elizabeth's Church in Jacksonville, Florida. In 1997, he became rector of St Peter’s Church in Fernandina Beach, Florida, where he remained until 2011.

On February 12, 2011, Young was elected as the fourth Bishop of East Tennessee and was consecrated on June 25, 2011 by Presiding Bishop Katharine Jefferts Schori at the Church of the Ascension in Knoxville, Tennessee. He was formally installed at St John’s Cathedral, Knoxville, Tennessee the next day, on June 26, 2011.  He retired in December 2017.

See also
 List of Episcopal bishops of the United States
 Historical list of the Episcopal bishops of the United States

References 

Episcopal Clerical Directory 2015

External links 
Episcopal Church website

1955 births
Living people
Episcopal bishops of East Tennessee
People from Jacksonville, Florida
Florida State University alumni